Signal transduction protein CBL-C is a protein that in humans is encoded by the CBLC gene.

CBL proteins, such as CBLC, are phosphorylated upon activation of a variety of receptors that signal via protein tyrosine kinases. Through interactions with proteins containing SRC (MIM 190090) homology-2 (SH2) and SH3 domains, CBL proteins modulate downstream cell signaling (Keane et al., 1999).[supplied by OMIM]

Interactions
CBLC has been shown to interact with FYN and Epidermal growth factor receptor.

References

External links

Further reading